The Kalanoro is a humanoid cryptid, who are believed to live as spirits on the island of Madagascar. Tradition states that they used to live corporeally in the rainforests, but habitat destruction cause their corporeal forms to go extinct.

Kalanoro are described as small and hairy humanoids with fangs. Their legs are said to be backwards, with backwards facing feet, and their eyes glow red. Their hair and fingernails are both long and unkempt. Living solitary lifestyles, they reportedly eat raw meat, and have a "whining voice" which scares dogs.

Stories of the kalanoro vary. They can be painted as malevolent spirits who will steal children, kill people, or rob them. The kalanoro in recent times is also associated with alcoholism. However. they are also seen as loyal servants to their human companions and can take a paternalistic interest in humans. A Sakalava tale has the kalanoro kidnap children, but only due to perceived mistreatment by their parents. Once the kalanoro's demands were met, the children were returned.

The cryptids were the subject of an episode of Destination Truth.

Kalanoro in Religious and Contemporary Practice

Kalanoro are said to act as spirit servants to the living. They reportedly steal and act as clairvoyants for their human companions, who can also draw on them for healing. If a person wishes to purchase the services of a kalanoro, they traditionally visit the "owner's" establishment at night, and only interact with them through a wall or closed door. It is said that when the human's voice becomes nasal and high-pitched, the kalanoro is speaking through them. Kalanoro are also said to impart taboos to people via their dreams or via visions.

It has also been suggested that the Vazimba are the ghosts of the kalanoro.

References

See also
 Vazimba

Malagasy mythology
African folklore
Hominid cryptids